The Longfellow Stakes is an American Thoroughbred horse race run each year in early June at Monmouth Park Racetrack in Oceanport, New Jersey.  A six furlong sprint for either gender aged three and up, the ungraded Longfellow offers a purse of $70,000 and a trophy.

The race, inaugurated in 1952, began as an eight furlong event.  From 1963 to 1967 it went off at eight and a half furlongs.  In 1968 it stretched out to nine furlongs and remained at that distance until 1996.  In 1997, it became a six furlong race.

The Longfellow is named for the U.S. Racing Hall of Fame inductee, Longfellow, one of America's great racehorses as well as one of the great stallions of the 19th century.

Records
In 2000, Delaware Township set a new stakes record of 1:07.84 while equaling the track record set in 1992 by Gilded Time.

Winners since 2000

Earlier winners

 1999 - My Jeffs Mombo
 1998 - Buffalo Dan
 1997 - Basqueian
 1996 - Ops Smile
 1995 - Boyce
 1994 - Winnetou
 1993 - First And Only
 1992 - Futurist
 1991 - Thunder Regent
 1990 - Great Normand
 1989 - Double Booked
 1988 - Triteamtri
 1987 - Owens Troupe
 1986 - I'm A Banker
 1985 - Cozzene 
 1984 - Tough Mickey
 1983 - John's Gold    
 1982 - Gilded Age    
 1981 - Data Swap   
 1980 - Foretake    
 1979 - Dan Horn   
 1978 - Dan Horn   
 1977 - Quick Card   
 1976 - Landscaper    
 1975 - Bucks Bid  
 1974 - Northern Fling   
 1973 - Dartsum    
 1972 - Good Counsel   
 1971 - Matto Grosso
 1970 - Ribofilio  
 1969 - Jean-Pierre    
 1968 - More Scents
 1967 - War Censor    
 1966 - In Zeal    
 1965 - Turbo Jet II   
 1964 - Parka 
 1963 - Parka   
 1962 - Royal Record    
 1961 - Call The Witness    
 1960 - Julmar   
 1959 - Lil Fella    
 1958 - Tudor Era    
 1957 - Combustion    
 1956 - Prince Morvi      
 1955 - County Clare    
 1954 - News Again    
 1953 - Thasian Hero   
 1952 - Crocodile

References
 Monmouth Park's official site
 Longfellow Stakes at Pedigree Query
 USA Today article on the 2008 Longfellow Stakes

Open sprint category horse races
Horse races in New Jersey
Monmouth Park Racetrack
Recurring sporting events established in 1952
1952 establishments in New Jersey